XHVD-FM is a radio station on 93.9 FM in Ciudad Allende, Coahuila. It is known as Radio Sensacional Digital.

History
XEVD-AM received its concession on November 9, 1976. It was owned by José Luis Moreno Vázquez and broadcast with 1 kW on 1380 kHz. After Moreno Vázquez's death, the station was transferred to his heirs.

References

Radio stations in Coahuila